The Dovecote, Hygga, Trellech, Monmouthshire is a late 16th-century  dovecote, in an unusually complete state of preservation. Part of the service buildings for the, now demolished, Hygga House, the dovecote is a Grade II* listed building and a scheduled monument.

History and description
The origin of the name Hygga is Old Norse, meaning "to comfort". In the 16th century, a substantial mansion, Hygga House, stood on the site but it has since been demolished. The dovecote, along with a large barn and a shippon and stables, comprised a range of service buildings for the house. In a poor state of repair for over two centuries, the dovecote was fully restored in the 1980s and now forms a rare example of a complete 16th-century dovecote. Sir Cyril Fox and Lord Raglan, in their three-volume guide Monmouthshire Houses, note the rarity of such dovecotes within the county, citing one at Llantellen, Skenfrith as the only other known example. The architectural historian John Newman gives a dating for the dovecote, and the associated barns, of c.1600.

The dovecote is constructed of lime-washed stone rubble, with a "stone-slated conical roof". Unusually for a dovecote, it has windows with ovolo mullions. Above the windows are six tiers of nesting boxes, set into the wall. The dovecote is a Scheduled monument, and a Grade II* listed building, its listing recording the dovecote as a "particularly fine and complete example".

Footnotes

References

Sources
 
 
 
 

Grade II* listed buildings in Monmouthshire
Scheduled monuments in Monmouthshire
Dovecotes